George Wylie (January 6, 1848December 8, 1926) was a Scottish American immigrant, livestock farmer, and Republican politician.  He was a member of the Wisconsin State Senate (1903, 1905) and State Assembly (1897, 1899), representing Columbia and Sauk counties.

Biography
Wylie was born on January 6, 1848, in Campbeltown, Scotland. Around 1857, he emigrated with his parents to Wauwatosa, Wisconsin, before moving to a farm in Leeds, Wisconsin, in 1864. After retiring from farming, Wylie settled in Morrisonville, Wisconsin.

He married Ida Carpenter Wylie (1852–1930) in 1884, with whom he had a son. Wylie died on December 8, 1926 in Madison, Wisconsin. He was buried at Windsor Congregational Cemetery in Windsor, Wisconsin.

Political career
Wylie was a member of the Assembly in 1897 in 1899 and of the Senate from 1903 to 1904. In addition, he was a member of the county board of Columbia County, Wisconsin. He was a Republican.

References

External links

People from Campbeltown
Scottish emigrants to the United States
People from Wauwatosa, Wisconsin
People from Leeds, Wisconsin
People from Windsor, Wisconsin
Republican Party Wisconsin state senators
Republican Party members of the Wisconsin State Assembly
County supervisors in Wisconsin
Farmers from Wisconsin
1848 births
1926 deaths